Somewhere may refer to:

Music

Albums 
 Somewhere (Eva Cassidy album) or the title song, 2008
 Somewhere (Keith Jarrett album), 2013
 Somewhere – The Songs of Sondheim and Bernstein, by Marina Prior, 1994
 Somewhere, or the title song, by The Tymes, 1963

Songs 
 "Somewhere" (song), from the musical West Side Story, 1956
 "Somewhere" (DJ Mog & Sarah Lynn song), 2010
 "Somewhere" (Shanice song), 1994
 "Somewhere", by American Music Club from California
 "Somewhere", by Jimi Hendrix from People, Hell and Angels
 "Somewhere", by La Toya Jackson from Bad Girl
 “Somewhere”, by Riot from Sons of Society
 “Somewhere”, by Robbie Williams from Reality Killed the Video Star
 "Somewhere", by Scissor Sisters from Magic Hour
 "Somewhere", by Soundgarden from Badmotorfinger
 "Somewhere", by Within Temptation from The Silent Force

Other uses 
 Somewhere (film), a 2010 film directed by Sofia Coppola
 Somewhere (artist collective), a UK-based creative organisation
 Somewhere, a subsidiary of the French retail group Redcats